Cryptolechia remotella is a moth in the family Depressariidae. It was described by Otto Staudinger in 1899. It is found in Patagonia.

References

Moths described in 1899
Cryptolechia (moth)